is a railway station on the Tobu Tojo Line in Itabashi, Tokyo, Japan, operated by the private railway operator Tobu Railway.

Lines
"Local" (all-stations) and Semi Express services stop at this station, with eight trains per hour in each direction during the daytime.

Station layout
The station consists of two island platforms serving four tracks. Platforms 2 and 4 are generally used to allow non-stop trains to pass stopping trains.

Platforms

History
The station opened on 17 June 1914.

From 17 March 2012, station numbering was introduced on the Tobu Tojo Line, with Kami-Itabashi Station becoming "TJ-07".

From March 2023, Kami-Itabashi Station became an Semi Express service stop following the abolishment of the Rapid (快速, Kaisoku) services and reorganization of the Tōbu Tōjō Line services.

Passenger statistics
In fiscal 2010, the station was used by an average of 48,882 passengers daily.

Surrounding area

 Itabashi Science and Education Hall
 Johoku-Chuo Park
 Itabashi Peace Park
 Tokyo Ōyama High School

See also
 List of railway stations in Japan

References

External links

Tobu station information 

Tobu Tojo Main Line
Stations of Tobu Railway
Railway stations in Tokyo
Railway stations in Japan opened in 1914